This is a list of avant-garde metal artists, regional scenes, and record labels. Avant-garde metal or avant-metal, also known as experimental metal, is a subgenre of heavy metal music loosely defined by use of experimentation and characterized by the use of innovative, avant-garde elements, large-scale experimentation, and the use of non-standard and unconventional sounds, instruments, song structures, playing styles, and vocal techniques. It evolved out of progressive rock and various forms of metal, including extreme metal, particularly the extreme subgenre death metal. Some early examples are the King Crimson releases Larks' Tongues in Aspic and Red in 1973 and 1974 respectively, and the 1976 Led Zeppelin album Presence. The genre emerged in the early 1980s through the efforts of bands such as Celtic Frost and Voivod, who pioneered the genre. Other pioneers of avant-garde metal include Boris, Earth, Helmet, maudlin of the Well, Neurosis, Sunn O))), and Mr. Bungle. In the late 1990s, Misanthropy Records emerged as a promoter of Norwegian avant-garde metal until it folded in 2000, and, according to Jeff Wagner, in the late 1990s and early 2000s, a so-called "new wave of avant-garde metal" was spearheaded by The End Records. Some other record labels which promote avant-garde metal are Aurora Borealis, The Flenser, Holy Records, Hydra Head Records, Ipecac Recordings, Napalm Records, the Relapse Entertainment imprint of Relapse Records, Seventh Rule Recordings, and Southern Lord Records. In the United States, local avant-garde metal scenes have emerged in the San Francisco Bay Area, with bands such as Giant Squid, Grayceon, and Ludicra, Boston, with bands such as Isis, Kayo Dot, and maudlin of the Well and Seattle. According to the New York Times, some regional scenes that developed in the mid-1990s included the cities of Tokyo, Los Angeles, and Oslo.

Record labels
 The End Records
 The Flenser
 Holy Records
 Hydra Head Records
 Ipecac Recordings
 Misanthropy Records
 Napalm Records
 Relapse Entertainment, imprint of Relapse Records
 Seventh Rule Recordings
 Southern Lord Records
Sumerian Records

Regional scenes
Norway
Oslo
Japan
Tokyo
United States
Boston
Los Angeles
San Francisco Bay Area
Seattle

Artists

0–9
 81db

A
 Abstrakt Algebra
 Acid Bath
 Agalloch
 Age of Silence
 Ahleuchatistas
 Ai Weiwei
 Alarum
 The Algorithm
 Altera Enigma
 Amenra
 Animals as Leaders
 Antigama
 Arashk
 Arcturus
 Atheist

B
 Babymetal
 Mick Barr
 Behold the Arctopus
 Bethlehem
 Black Flag
 Blut Aus Nord
 The Body
 Boris
 Borknagar
 Boulder
 Breadwinner
 Buckethead
 Buried Inside

C
 Candiria
 Cave In
 Celtic Frost
 Cephalic Carnage
 Circle
 Conelrad
 Coroner
 The Contortionist
 Cronian
 Chryst
 Cult of Luna
 Cynic

D
 December Wolves
 Devilish Impressions
 The Devin Townsend Project
 Devolved
 Diablo Swing Orchestra
 The Dillinger Escape Plan
 Dir En Grey
 Disharmonic Orchestra
 Dødheimsgard
 Dog Fashion Disco
 Doom
 Draconian

E
 Earth
 The End
 Envy
 Ephel Duath
 Ewigkeit
 Extol

F
 Fact
 Fantômas
 The Flying Luttenbachers
 Frantic Bleep
 From a Second Story Window

G
 The Gathering
 God
 Genghis Tron
 Giant Squid
 Glassjaw
 Grayceon
 Godflesh
 Green Carnation

H
 Hammers of Misfortune
 Hawk Eyes
 Head of David
 Hella
 Helmet
 Horse the Band
 Hortus Animae
 Hypno5e

I
Imperial Triumphant
 Inhale Exhale
 Into Another
 Intronaut
 Jon Irabagon
 Isis
 Iwrestledabearonce

J
 Jane's Addiction
 Jesu

K
 Kayo Dot
 Kekal
 Khanate
 Khlyst
 Killing Joke
 King Crimson
 KK Null
 The Kovenant
 Krallice
 Kylesa

L
 Lengsel
 Leprous
 Liturgy
 Living Colour
 Locrian
 Ludicra

M
 Made Out of Babies
 Manes
 The Mars Volta
 Master's Hammer
 Mastodon
 Maudlin of the Well
 Mayhem
 The Meads of Asphodel
 Melvins
 Meshuggah
 Motograter
 Mr. Bungle
 Mudvayne
 Mushroomhead
 My Dying Bride

N
 Naked City
 Napalm Death
 Neurosis
 The Number Twelve Looks Like You

O
 O'Brother
 O, Majestic Winter
 The Ocean
 Old
 Opera IX
 Opeth
 Orthrelm
 Oxbow

P
 Painkiller
 Pain of Salvation
 Pan.Thy.Monium
 Mike Patton
 Peccatum
 Pelican
 Periphery
 Pinkly Smooth
 Pin-Up Went Down
 Planning for Burial
 James Plotkin
 Polkadot Cadaver
 Portal
 Praxis
 Protest the Hero
 Psychofagist
 Psyopus

Q
 Queenadreena
 Queensrÿche
 Qui

R
Ram-Zet
 Vernon Reid
 Russian Circles

S
 Saccharine Trust
 Samsas Traum
 Sculptured
 Shining (Norwegian band)
 Shining (Swedish band)
 Sigh
 Sikth
 Sleepytime Gorilla Museum
 Smohalla
 Solefald
 Sound of Urchin
 Spektr
 Stork
 Strapping Young Lad
 Sunn O)))
 System of a Down

T
 Talons
 Therion
 Thought Industry
 Thrones
 Thy Catafalque
 Tiamat 
 Today Is the Day
 Todd Smith
 Tomahawk
 Tombs
 The Tony Danza Tapdance Extravaganza
 Tool
 Treponem Pal
 Triptykon
 Twelve Foot Ninja

U
 Ufomammut
 Ulcerate
 Ulver
 Unexpect

V
 Ved Buens Ende
 Vernon Reid
 Virgin Black
 Vintersorg
 Voivod

W
 Waltari
 Winds
 Wrench in the Works

Y
 Yakuza

Z
 Zoroaster
 Zeal & Ardor

See also
List of progressive metal bands
List of mathcore bands

Notes

References
Wagner, Jeff (2010). Mean Deviation. Bazillion Points. .

Avant-garde metal